Mean What You Say is an album by drummer Philly Joe Jones that was recorded in 1977 and released on the Sonet label.

Reception

The AllMusic review by Bob Rusch stated: "This was a nice blowing date for Bowen, who at the time had an R&B background and had never before recorded a jazz album...Mickey Tucker was very strong on this set and at times almost seemed to be the leader with Jones seemingly pushing to assert his position. Still, this was an enjoyable recording with just that little extra added personality to give it an extra edge".

Track listing
 "Mean What You Say" (Thad Jones) – 8:05  
 "You Tell Me" (Simmons) – 6:59
 "D. C. Farewell" (Richie Cole) – 6:00  
 "Jim's Jewel" (Charles Bowen) - 6:40  
 "Gretchen" (Bowen) – 7:00
 "Ugetsu" (Cedar Walton) – 7:22

Personnel
Philly Joe Jones – drums 
Tommy Turrentine – trumpet (tracks 2-5)
Charles Bowen – soprano saxophone, tenor saxophone
Mickey Tucker – piano
Mickey Bass – bass

References

Sonet Records albums
Philly Joe Jones albums
1977 albums